Haris Xanthoudakis (born 1950) is a Greek composer.

A native of Piraeus, Xanthoudakis studied with Iannis Xenakis, among others. Besides music, he has worked in the fields of philology, glottology, semiotics, and art history. Xanthoudakis taught in various conservatories around Europe before becoming, in 1992, professor of music at the Ionian University on Corfu.

Discography 
Agora Records has released Xanthoudakis' Terra Dove as part of its survey of Greek orchestral music recorded by the Carlsbad Symphony Orchestra under Byron Fidetzis.

References 
Agora Records, Music of Alexiadis/Dragatakis/Haliassas/Koukos/Maragopulos/Xanthoudakis/Zannas, CD

1950 births
Living people
Musicians from Piraeus
Greek classical composers
Male classical composers
20th-century classical composers
20th-century male musicians
21st-century classical composers
21st-century male musicians